Katherine Vibert (born January 5, 1999) is an American weightlifter, Olympian, World Champion, Pan American champion and Junior World Champion competing in the 69 kg category until 2018 and 71 kg starting in 2018 after the International Weightlifting Federation reorganized the categories. She is a winner of the IWF Female Lifter of the Year for 2019.

Career
She won a silver medal in the 69kg division at the 2018 Junior World Weightlifting Championships.

In 2019, she competed at the Pan American Weightlifting Championships in the 71 kg division against teammate Mattie Rogers. During the competition she set Panamerican records in the snatch and total on her way to winning gold medals in all three lifts. In June 2019, she competed at the Junior World Weightlifting Championships in the 71 kg category, where her total of 246 kg was a full 34 kg over the silver medalist.

At the 2019 World Weightlifting Championships she competed in the 71 kg division against teammate Mattie Rogers. In the snatch portion she set a junior world record with a 112 kg lift. She completed a 136 kg clean & jerk to sweep gold medals in all lifts. She became the youngest U.S. woman to win a World championship, and the second since Robin Goad in 1994. With her gold medals at the Pan American Weightlifting Championships, Junior World Weightlifting Championships and World Weightlifting Championships in 2019 she was awarded the 2019 IWF Lifter of the Year with 9,105 votes.

In 2021, she competed at the 2020 Olympics in the women's 76 kg event. She won a silver medal in the event.

Major results

References

External links

Living people
1999 births
American female weightlifters
World Weightlifting Championships medalists
Pan American Games medalists in weightlifting
Pan American Games bronze medalists for the United States
Weightlifters at the 2019 Pan American Games
Medalists at the 2019 Pan American Games
Sportspeople from Oakland County, Michigan
Pan American Weightlifting Championships medalists
Weightlifters at the 2020 Summer Olympics
Olympic silver medalists for the United States in weightlifting
Medalists at the 2020 Summer Olympics
21st-century American women